Zachary Michael MacMath (born August 7, 1991) is an American professional soccer player who plays as a goalkeeper for Major League Soccer club Real Salt Lake. MacMath was drafted No. 5 overall in the 2011 MLS SuperDraft by the Philadelphia Union.

Early and personal life
MacMath was born in St. Petersburg, Florida, the son of Marcia and Gary MacMath. MacMath is Jewish. His mother is Jewish, his father is Catholic, and MacMath himself practices Judaism. He had a Bar Mitzvah at Temple Beth El, a Reform synagogue in his hometown.

He attended the St. Petersburg High School in his hometown as a freshman, and then attended the IMG Soccer Academy in Bradenton, Florida. He was a two-time Parade magazine High School All-American soccer goalkeeper.

Club career

College and amateur 

MacMath attended the University of Maryland, where he was first choice goalkeeper for three seasons, winning a national title and numerous individual awards along the way. It was during this time that he had a training stint with English Premier League club Everton. At the end of the 2008 season and the 2010 season, MacMath was named to the Jewish Sports Review's All-America team.

Professional

MacMath was drafted No. 5 overall in the 2011 MLS SuperDraft by the Philadelphia Union. MacMath started his first string of games in September 2011 due to the injury of starting keeper Faryd Mondragon. After failing to make the 2012  MLS Cup Playoffs, MacMath joined Premier League side Everton for a training stint during the MLS off-season.

In January 2015, MacMath was loaned to Colorado Rapids for the 2015 season.

MacMath's option was declined by Philadelphia at the end of the 2015 MLS season. He was later traded to Colorado in exchange for a second-round pick in the 2017 MLS SuperDraft.

On December 9, 2018, MacMath was traded to Vancouver Whitecaps FC in exchange for Nicolás Mezquida and $100,000 in Targeted Allocation Money (TAM).

On December 17, 2019, Real Salt Lake acquired MacMath from Vancouver in exchange for $50,000 in TAM in 2020.

International career 
MacMath played in the 2009 Maccabiah Games in Israel, where the American Maccabiah team did not earn a medal.

MacMath led the U.S. U-20 men’s national team to the Milk Cup title, posting a strong performance that helped defeat host Northern Ireland, 3–0, at the Showgrounds in Ballymena, on July 30, 2010. MacMath finished the tournament unbeaten after recording a 1–0 victory over China on July 26. MacMath also participated in both training camps in Florida last December and January.

MacMath along with Union teammate Amobi Okugo were called up to the U-20 squad for the CONCACAF U-20 Championship in March–April. The Philadelphia Union is the only Major League Soccer team with two players represented. MacMath also trained with the U-23 Olympic squad in preparation for the 2012 London Olympics in two camps prior to qualifying.

Career statistics

See also
List of Jewish footballers
List of Jews in sports

References

External links
 
 U.S. soccer profile
 Terrapins profile

1991 births
Living people
American soccer players
Jewish American sportspeople
Maryland Terrapins men's soccer players
Philadelphia Union players
Colorado Rapids players
Maccabiah Games competitors for the United States
Maccabiah Games footballers
Competitors at the 2009 Maccabiah Games
Soccer players from St. Petersburg, Florida
Philadelphia Union draft picks
Major League Soccer players
United States men's youth international soccer players
United States men's under-20 international soccer players
All-American men's college soccer players
Association football goalkeepers
Vancouver Whitecaps FC players
Real Salt Lake players
21st-century American Jews
Jewish footballers